Dayanand Chandrashekhar Shetty (born 11 December 1969) is an Indian film and television actor and model, best known for his role as Senior Inspector Daya Singh in India's longest-running television police procedural CID. He was inducted into the Gold Awards Hall of Fame in 2018.

Career 
He is a sportsman-turned-actor due to a leg injury. He was a shot put and discus thrower, which won him many prizes in these sports. He was the champion of discus throw from Maharashtra in 1996. He has acted in many commercials and has even won awards as a theatre artist. He won the Best Actor award for his role in the Tulu language play Secret.

He then auditioned for the role of CID officer in 1998 and was the one who got selected. He is known for his role of Senior Inspector Daya in CID. He along with actors Shivaji Satam and Aditya Srivastava are the main leads of the show. He has also written for some of the episodes of CID.

In CID, Senior Inspector Daya is known for his immense strength, whose name is enough to make the toughest of criminals break down. Daya's signature dialogue in CID is "Jab Daya ka hath padta hai, to muh ke andar daaton se piano bajne lagta hai" (meaning "When Daya slaps, then a piano plays in the mouth by the teeth"). One of the most famous dialogues in CID is that of ACP Pradyuman asking him "Daya darwaaza tod do" (meaning "Daya, break the door"). This dialogue become so popular that it is even used in the film Singham Returns, which is one of the most appreciated scenes of the film. In CID, Daya is also critical in finding the clues to solve the case. Although tough in appearance, he is also soft-mannered and sympathetic in nature and is always the first one to support team members and others when they need it the most.
 
Shetty has acted in TV commercials, plays and films. He also won the "Best Looking Guy" vote, conducted by Indian Television in 2002. He also participated in Jhalak Dikhhla Jaa (Season 4), dance reality show.

A song was recorded for CID episode (aired on 21 January 2012), which was a lullaby sung by Shetty and his fellow actors Shivaji Satam and Aditya Shrivastava. His talent as a singer has been appreciated in talk shows like Movers and Shakers as well.

The movies he has acted in include Johnny Gaddaar, Runway and Singham Returns.

Daya Shetty has made guest appearances in shows like Jassi Jaissi Koi Nahin and Kkusum. He has acted in Gutur Gu, which is a silent comedy show (in both season one and two). He has made appearances as Celebrity Guest in shows including Deal Ya No Deal, Entertainment Ke Liye Kuch Bhi Karega (season 4), Kahani Comedy Circus Ki and Aapka Sapna Hamara Apna.

He participated in 5th season of Khatron Ke Khiladi doing many stunts, but was eventually eliminated.

Daya Shetty and Shivaji Satam appeared as Celebrity Guests in the TV show Sa Re Ga Ma Pa L'il Champs (in the Independence Day Special episode of 2011). Daya Shetty, Shivaji Satam, Aditya Srivastava and Narendra Gupta also appeared in Kaun Banega Crorepati in 2014. He has won the best-supporting actor award (for the role of Senior Inspector Daya in CID) in the Gold Awards 2012.

Personal life 
Dayanand Shetty was born on 11 December 1969, in a Tulu speaking Bunt family in Katapadi village of Udupi district of Karnataka State in India to Chandra Prakash Shetty and Uma Shetty. He has two sisters (Naina and Sandhya). He did his B.com from Rizvi College, Bandra. He married Smitha Shetty and they have a daughter, Viva Shetty.He has studied in Shree Ram Welfare High School in Andheri.

Filmography

Film

Television

Awards
Gold Awards
2011:Won Gold Award for Best Supporting Actor (Critics) for CID
2018:Inducted- Hall of Fame for CID

References

External links

Indian male film actors
Indian male television actors
Living people
Male actors in Hindi cinema
Indian male stage actors
Male actors from Karnataka
Tulu people
1969 births
People from Udupi district
Male actors in Hindi television
21st-century Indian male actors
Fear Factor: Khatron Ke Khiladi participants